Leslie Smith (born August 17, 1982) is an American professional female mixed martial artist, who competes in Bellator MMA. She formerly competed in Invicta FC where she was a main card staple of the organization, having fought on the main card four times in the first five shows. She also competed in the Ultimate Fighting Championship. Smith fights out of the Cesar Gracie Jiu-Jitsu team and is noted for a similar level of high volume striking and aggressiveness to other members of that camp. Smith most recently competed in the Bellator Fighting Championships at featherweight. 

A documentary about Smith's early career, Fight For It, was released in 2012.

Martial arts career

Invicta FC
Smith entered Invicta Fighting Championships as a prospect with a 3-2 professional mixed martial arts record. She made her debut at Invicta FC 1: Coenen vs. Ruyssen on April 28, 2012. In her first bout with the organization, she fought veteran Kaitlin Young to an exciting draw, earning the Fight of the Night bonus (US$1,500 bonus to each fighter).

Amanda Nunes was scheduled to fight Milana Dudieva at Invicta FC 2: Baszler vs. McMann, but Dudieva withdrew from the fight on July 9 due to a medical illness and was replaced by Smith. However, on July 20, Smith suffered a hand injury that forced her to also withdraw from the fight. She was then replaced by Raquel Pa'aluhi in the fight with Nunes.

Smith was then scheduled to fight Cat Zingano at Invicta FC 3: Penne vs. Sugiyama, but the promotion allowed Zingano to withdraw from the fight so that she could accept a fight for Strikeforce. Zingano was replaced by pro boxer and undefeated MMA fighter, Kim Connor-Hamby. Sarah Kaufman was set to fight Kaitlin Young, but an injury forced Kaufman to withdraw from the fight on September 17. As a result, Smith was moved from her fight with Connor-Hamby in order to face Young in a rematch from their Fight of the Night draw at Invicta FC 1 to determine a final winner. This time, Smith was able to get the better of Young and she defeated her by TKO in the second round.

Smith competed once again for Invicta FC on January 5, 2013, this time on the main card of Invicta FC 4: Esparza vs. Hyatt against Raquel Pennington. Smith defeated Pennington by unanimous decision.

Having gone unbeaten in three fights, Smith moved up in competition at Invicta FC 5: Penne vs. Waterson when she faced former Strikeforce Women's Bantamweight Champion Sarah Kaufman on April 5, 2013. Smith lost a controversial split decision to Kaufman, which drew booing from the crowd. During the fight, Kaufman used footwork to stay on the outside whilst Smith played the aggressor and set a high work rate. Smith was able to drop Kaufman with a head kick in the second round but was unable to stop a late surge from Kaufman in the final round. The fight was declared Fight of the Night (Smith's second) and both fighters were awarded bonuses.

Smith returned to fight at Invicta FC 6: Coenen vs. Cyborg on July 13, 2013. She made her flyweight debut against Jennifer Maia in a title eliminator bout. Smith won the fight via unanimous decision. The bout was named Fight of the Night.

Smith challenged Barb Honchak for the Invicta FC flyweight championship at Invicta FC 7 on December 7, 2013. She lost the fight via unanimous decision and earned yet another Fight of the Night bonus.

Ultimate Fighting Championship
On April 8, 2014, it was announced that Smith would step in to replace an injured Amanda Nunes against Sarah Kaufman at The Ultimate Fighter Nations Finale on April 16, 2014. She lost the rematch via unanimous decision.

Smith faced Jessamyn Duke at UFC Fight Night: Cerrone vs. Miller on July 16, 2014. Smith won the fight via TKO in the first round.

Smith fought Jessica Eye at UFC 180. The bout was stopped in the 2nd round due to a stoppage by the cage-side doctor, as Smith's cauliflower ear split open.

Smith fought Rin Nakai at UFC Fight Night: Hunt vs. Mir on March 20, 2016. She won the fight by unanimous decision (30–27, 29–28, and 29–28).

Smith fought Cris Cyborg at UFC 198 on May 14, 2016. She lost the fight by TKO early in the first round.

Smith next faced Irene Aldana on December 17, 2016, at UFC on Fox: VanZant vs. Waterson.  She won the fight by unanimous decision. The bout also earned Smith her first Fight of the Night bonus award in the UFC.

Smith faced Amanda Lemos on July 16, 2017, at UFC Fight Night: Nelson vs. Ponzinibbio. She won the fight via TKO due to a combination of punches and elbows in the second round.

Smith was scheduled to face Aspen Ladd on April 21, 2018, at UFC Fight Night 128. At the weigh-ins, Ladd weighed in at 137.8 pounds, 1.8 pounds over the bantamweight non-title fight upper limit of 136 pounds. Ladd offered Leslie an additional $5,000 on top of her 20% purse deduction. However, the fight was removed from the card after Smith refused to fight at catchweight. Subsequently, the UFC paid Smith her show and win money but then released her from the promotion.

Bellator MMA
An April 16, 2019, it was announced that Smith has signed with Bellator MMA. She faced Sinead Kavanagh in her promotional debut at Bellator 224 on July 12, 2019. She won the fight by majority decision.

Smith faced Arlene Blencowe at Bellator 233 on November 8, 2019. She lost the fight by unanimous decision.

Smith was expected to face Jessy Miele at Bellator 241 on March 13, 2020. However, the whole event was eventually cancelled due to the prevailing COVID-19 pandemic.

Smith fought for the Bellator Women's Featherweight World Championship against Cris Cyborg on May 21, 2021, in the main event at Bellator 259. They previously met at UFC 198, which was Cyborg's UFC debut, where she won by TKO in the first round. She lost the bout via TKO after being knocked down and finished with punches late in the last round.

Personal life
Smith has an Associate of Arts degree from Pikes Peak Community College. She played water polo at South Pasadena High School, where she was named All-CIF and team MVP. She is currently studying bachelor's degree in labor and employer relations at Rutgers University.

In August 2016, Smith revealed that she had a benign tumor on her stomach.

In 2018, Smith started Project Spearhead, an organization that is attempting to unionize UFC and MMA fighters. Smith also recently gave a speech during a conference for the Economic Policy Institute regarding Project Spearhead.

Championships and accomplishments
Kickdown MMA
Kickdown Women's Bantamweight (One time)
Invicta Fighting Championships
Fight of the Night (Four times) vs. Kaitlin Young, Sarah Kaufman, Jennifer Maia, Barb Honchak 
Ultimate Fighting Championship
Fight of the Night (One time)  vs. Irene Aldana

Mixed martial arts record

|-
|Loss
|align=center|12–9–1
|Cris Cyborg
|TKO (punches)
|Bellator 259
|
|align=center|5
|align=center|4:51
|Uncasville, Connecticut, United States
|
|-
|Win
|align=center|12–8–1
|Amanda Bell
|Decision (unanimous)
|Bellator 245
|
|align=center|3
|align=center|5:00
|Uncasville, Connecticut, United States
|
|-
|Loss
|align=center|11–8–1
|Arlene Blencowe
|Decision (unanimous)
|Bellator 233
|
|align=center|3
|align=center|5:00
|Thackerville, Oklahoma, United States
|
|-
|Win
|align=center|11–7–1
|Sinead Kavanagh
|Decision (majority)
|Bellator 224
|
|align=center|3
|align=center|5:00
|Thackerville, Oklahoma, United States
|
|-
|Win
|align=center|
|Amanda Lemos
|TKO (punches and elbows)
|UFC Fight Night: Nelson vs. Ponzinibbio
|
|align=center|2
|align=center|2:53
|Glasgow, Scotland
|
|-
|Win
|align=center|9–7–1
|Irene Aldana
|Decision (unanimous)
|UFC on Fox: VanZant vs. Waterson
|
|align=center|3
|align=center|5:00
|Sacramento, California, United States
|
|-
|Loss
|align=center|8–7–1
|Cris Cyborg
|TKO (punches)
|UFC 198
|
|align=center|1
|align=center|1:21
|Curitiba, Brasil
|
|-
|Win
|align=center|8–6–1
|Rin Nakai
|Decision (unanimous)
|UFC Fight Night: Hunt vs. Mir
|
|align=center|3
|align=center|5:00
|Brisbane, Australia
|
|-
|Loss
|align=center|7–6–1
|Jessica Eye
|TKO (doctor stoppage)
|UFC 180
|
|align=center|2
|align=center|1:30
|Mexico City, Mexico
|
|-
|Win
|align=center|7–5–1
|Jessamyn Duke
|TKO (punches)
|UFC Fight Night: Cowboy vs. Miller
|
|align=center|1
|align=center|2:24
|Atlantic City, New Jersey, United States
|
|-
|Loss
|align=center|6–5–1
|Sarah Kaufman
|Decision (unanimous)
|The Ultimate Fighter Nations Finale: Bisping vs. Kennedy
|
|align=center|3 
|align=center|5:00 
|Quebec City, Quebec, Canada
|
|-
|Loss
|align=center|6–4–1
|Barb Honchak
|Decision (unanimous)
|Invicta FC 7: Honchak vs. Smith
|
|align=center|5
|align=center|5:00
|Kansas City, Missouri, United States
|
|-
|Win
|align=center|6–3–1
|Jennifer Maia
|Decision (unanimous)
|Invicta FC 6: Coenen vs. Cyborg
|
|align=center|3
|align=center|5:00
|Kansas City, Missouri, United States
|
|-
|Loss
|align=center|5–3–1
|Sarah Kaufman
|Decision (split)
|Invicta FC 5: Penne vs. Waterson
|
|align=center|3
|align=center|5:00
|Kansas City, Missouri, United States
|
|-
|Win
|align=center|5–2–1
|Raquel Pennington
|Decision (unanimous)
|Invicta FC 4: Esparza vs. Hyatt
|
|align=center|3
|align=center|5:00
|Kansas City, Kansas, United States
|
|-
|Win
|align=center|4–2–1
|Kaitlin Young
|TKO (punches)
|Invicta FC 3: Penne vs. Sugiyama
|
|align=center|2
|align=center|2:19
|Kansas City, Kansas, United States
|
|-
|Draw
|align=center|3–2–1
|Kaitlin Young
|Draw (split)
|Invicta FC 1: Coenen vs. Ruyssen
|
|align=center|3
|align=center|5:00
|Kansas City, Kansas, United States
|
|-
|Loss
|align=center|3–2
|Ediane Gomes
|Decision (unanimous)
|BEP 5: Breast Cancer Beatdown
|
|align=center|3
|align=center|5:00
|Fletcher, North Carolina, United States
|
|-
|Win
|align=center|3–1
|Julia Griffin
|Decision (unanimous)
|FE: Arctic Combat 2
|
|align=center|3
|align=center|3:00
|Fairbanks, Alaska, United States
|
|-
|Win
|align=center|2–1
|Louise Johnson
|TKO (punches)
|Kickdown 74: Grudge
|
|align=center|2
|align=center|1:35
|Denver, Colorado, United States
|
|-
|Loss
|align=center|1–1
|Kerry Vera
|Decision (unanimous)
|Bellator 7
|
|align=center|3
|align=center|5:00
|Chicago, Illinois, United States
|
|-
|Win
|align=center|1–0
|Louise Johnson
|TKO (punches)
|Kickdown 61: Retaliation
|
|align=center|3
|align=center|4:16
|Denver, Colorado, United States
|

See also
 List of current UFC fighters
 List of female mixed martial artists

References

External links
 Leslie Smith at AwakeningFighters.com
 
 Leslie Smith at Invicta FC
 
 

1982 births
Living people
Flyweight mixed martial artists
American practitioners of Brazilian jiu-jitsu
Female Brazilian jiu-jitsu practitioners
Mixed martial artists from California
Bantamweight mixed martial artists
Mixed martial artists utilizing Brazilian jiu-jitsu
American female mixed martial artists
People from Pleasant Hill, California
People from Santa Ana, California
Sportspeople from Santa Ana, California
Ultimate Fighting Championship female fighters
21st-century American women